Carlos Alberto González Romero (born in 1960 in Coronel) is a Chilean football manager.

In 2004, he was signed by Deportes Temuco. That season he put the team into the Torneo Apertura and Torneo Clausura quarterfinals.

On December 12, 2005, he agreed a contract with Santiago Wanderers to coach them for face the Torneo Apertura. On July 3, he was fired from Wanderers.

In 2006, he returned to Temuco to coach the now called Deportivo Temuco. On April 23, 2007, he was fired from Deportivo Temuco, being replaced by Eduardo Bonvallet.

References

External links
 Carlos González at MemoriaWanderers 

Living people
1960 births
People from Coronel
Chilean footballers
Chilean expatriate footballers
Lota Schwager footballers
Universidad de Chile footballers
Naval de Talcahuano footballers
C.D. Arturo Fernández Vial footballers
Club Deportivo Palestino footballers
Unión Española footballers
Sporting Cristal footballers
Deportivo Saprissa players
C.D. Luis Ángel Firpo footballers
Deportes La Serena footballers
Audax Italiano footballers
Deportes Concepción (Chile) footballers
Chilean Primera División players
Peruvian Primera División players
Liga FPD players
Salvadoran Primera División players
Primera B de Chile players
Association football midfielders
Chilean football managers
Deportes Concepción (Chile) managers
Deportes Temuco managers
Santiago Wanderers managers
Arturo Fernández Vial managers
Chilean Primera División managers
Primera B de Chile managers
Chilean expatriate sportspeople in Peru
Chilean expatriate sportspeople in Costa Rica
Chilean expatriate sportspeople in El Salvador
Expatriate footballers in Peru
Expatriate footballers in Costa Rica
Expatriate footballers in El Salvador